Pic de Médécourbe (Catalan: Pic de Medacorba) is a mountain in Europe that sits on the western tripoint boundary of Andorra, France and Spain. It overlooks Étang de Soulcem, a large artificial lake used for hydroelectricity, and the Vicdessos valley.

There is also an eastern tripoint of Andorra, France, and Spain approximately 6 km south of Pas de la Casa.

References

Mountains of the Pyrenees
Mountains of Andorra
Mountains of Occitania (administrative region)
Mountains of Catalonia
International mountains of Europe
Andorra–France border
Andorra–Spain border
France–Spain border
Border tripoints
Two-thousanders of Andorra
Two-thousanders of France
Landforms of Ariège (department)